Mikhail Vladimirovich Viktorov (December 24, 1893 – August 1, 1938) was a Russian military leader and Commander-in-Chief of the Soviet Naval Forces from August 1937 to January 1938.

Career
Born at Yaroslavl, Viktorov was the son of an officer and graduated from the Naval Academy with the gold medal as top cadet in 1913. During World War I he served with the Baltic Fleet and was navigating officer of the battleship Tsesarevich and fought in the Battle of Moon Sound.

In the Civil War he joined the Bolsheviks and commanded the cruiser Oleg and subsequently the battleships Andrei Pervozvanny and Gangut. In 1921 he contributed to the suppression of the Kronstadt rebellion.

Between December 1924 and April 1926 he was named Chief of the Central Hydrographic Department of the USSR. From 1925 he commanded the Soviet Baltic Fleet and in 1932 was the founding commander of the Soviet Pacific Fleet.

He became commander of the Soviet navy following the arrest of his predecessor. Viktorov was himself arrested at the end of 1937 and was shot in 1938. He was posthumously rehabilitated in 1956.

See also
 Russian Hydrographic Service

References 

1893 births
1938 deaths
People from Yaroslavl
Imperial Russian Navy officers
Russian military personnel of World War I
Soviet military personnel of the Russian Civil War
Soviet Navy officers
Communist Party of the Soviet Union members
Recipients of the Order of Lenin
Recipients of the Order of the Red Banner
Recipients of the Order of Saint Stanislaus (Russian)
Soviet rehabilitations
Great Purge victims from Russia